The indio was a silver coin minted by the Portuguese government as a currency to support trade with India. There are only two recovered coins of this mintage, making it very rare.

History
Following the discovery by Vasco da Gama, King Manuel I of Portugal ordered the indio, as well as the português, to be minted to support trade with India. The indio was minted for less than five years, being discontinued prior to 1504 in favor of the tostão.

Design
According to Damião de Góis, the weight of the coin was ordered to equal the mass of the coins used by Italy, 3 grams.

The reverse side bears markings from the Military Order of Christ, which King Manuel had also adopted as his personal insignia.

Examples
There are only two recovered coins of this type.

Coin 1
The first coin has been held in the National Historical Museum of Brazil, which houses the largest numismatic collection of Latin America.

Coin 2
The second coin was recovered from the excavation of the Esmeralda. This recovery of this example, forged in 1499, was announced in 2016 following excavation of the 1503 shipwreck off the coast of Oman, on Al-Hallaniyah island in the Khuriya Muriya island chain. This example was compared to the first using CT scan and authenticated by João Pedro Vieira, Curator of Coins and Paper Money with the Bank of Portugal.

External links
 
 Youtube video of recovery and CT scan

References 

Silver coins